Staffordshire Police is the territorial police force responsible for policing Staffordshire and Stoke-on-Trent in the West Midlands of England. It is made up of eleven Local Policing Teams, whose boundaries are matched to the nine local authorities within Staffordshire.

History

A combined force covering Staffordshire and Stoke-on-Trent, called Staffordshire County and Stoke-on-Trent Constabulary, was established on 1 January 1968, as a merger of the Staffordshire County Police and Stoke-on-Trent City Police.  This force lost areas to the new West Midlands Police in 1974 under the Local Government Act 1972 and adopted a shorter name.

Under proposals made by the Home Secretary on 6 February 2006, it would have merged with Warwickshire Constabulary, West Mercia Constabulary and West Midlands Police to form a single strategic force for the West Midlands region. However these plans have not been taken forward largely due to public opposition.

For 2005/06 Staffordshire police topped the Home Office chart as being the best performing police force in England and Wales.

Chief constables
1842–1857: John Hayes Hatton
1857–??: Lt-Col Gilbert Hogg
1888–1929: George Augustus Anson
1929–1951: Colonel Sir Herbert Hunter
1951–1960: George William Richard Hearn
1960–1964: Stanley Edwards Peck
1964–1977: Arthur Rees
1977–1996: Charles Henry Kelly
1996–2006: John Giffard
2006–2007: David Swift
2007–2009: Chris Sims
2009–2015: Mike Cunningham
2015–2017: Jane Sawyers
2017–2021: Gareth Morgan
2021: Emma Barnett (temporary)
2021–present: Chris Noble

Officers killed in the line of duty

The Police Roll of Honour Trust and Police Memorial Trust list and commemorate all British police officers killed in the line of duty. Since its establishment in 1984, the Police Memorial Trust has erected 50 memorials nationally to some of those officers.

The following officers of Staffordshire Police are listed by the Trust as having died attempting to prevent, stop or solve a crime, since the turn of the 20th century:
PC William Ezra Price, 1903 (fatally injured attempting to arrest three men)
PC Brinley James Booth, 1946 (bludgeoned to death while attempting to arrest a suspect)
PC John David Taylor, 1986 (pushed out of a building by a suspect)

Organisation
Staffordshire Police is one of two forces involved in the Central Motorway Police Group along with West Midlands Police. This unit provides roads policing for the motorway network in the West Midlands (mainly M5, M6 and M42). Staffordshire Police has a roads policing unit who police the roads across the county. Staffordshire Police had a mounted division until 1999 where a major reorganisation saw it disbanded. 

In September 2008, the force announced that it intended to vacate the Cannock Road site and sell it for housing development, moving HQ staff to Lanchester Court, next to the existing Weston Road premises.

Staffordshire Police Authority, a separate organisation charged with oversight of the force, had 9 councillors (drawn from both Staffordshire County Council and Stoke-on-Trent City Council), 3 justices of the peace, and 5 independent members.

The authority was abolished in November 2012,
following the election of the first Staffordshire Police and Crime Commissioner (PCC), Matthew Ellis. The office of the police and crime commissioner and the individual elected is responsible for reducing crime and making the area they represent safer. The PCC decides how much council tax people will pay towards community safety services and policing and is personally accountable for all the public money spent. In 2021, Ben Adams was elected as the new police, fire and crime commissioner, a role previously expanded to include oversight of Staffordshire Fire and Rescue Service.

Staffordshire Police Cadets

The Staffordshire Police Cadet scheme aims to strengthen links between the police and young people and promote good citizenship. The programme's chief officer is Chief Superintendent Elliot Sharrad William. The programs deputy chief officer (DCO) is also the DCO of the Special Constabulary; the cadets force also has many special constables, regular police constables and PSV's (police service volunteers) that assist in the running of the units.

The scheme has a ranking system similar to that of the Special Constabulary. This ranking system contains a head cadet, deputy head cadet, section leaders, and then the rank of cadet. There is also a ranking system for the volunteer leaders. This contains a unit commander, deputy unit commander, leaders, young leaders. The rank insignia is the same as the Special Constabulary in the sense of using bars to represent the rank (for example the rank of section leader is equal to the rank of sergeant and has the same insignia as one bar on each shoulder).

See also
List of law enforcement agencies in the United Kingdom, Crown Dependencies and British Overseas Territories
Law enforcement in the United Kingdom

References

External links

 Staffordshire Police at HMICFRS
Staffordshire Police Cadets

Organisations based in Staffordshire
Organisations based in Stoke-on-Trent
Police forces of England
1968 establishments in England
Organizations established in 1968